The Judge Advocate General of the Navy (JAG) is the highest-ranking uniformed lawyer in the United States Department of the Navy. The Judge Advocate General is the principal advisor to the Secretary of the Navy and the Chief of Naval Operations on legal matters pertaining to the Navy. The Judge Advocate General also performs other duties prescribed to them under  and those prescribed under the Uniform Code of Military Justice.

Duties
The Judge Advocate General of the Navy, according to the United States Navy Regulations, has three principal roles: Staff Assistant in the Office of the Secretary of the Navy, commanding the Office of the Judge Advocate General (OJAG), and is Chief of the Judge Advocate General’s Corps.

The Judge Advocate General maintains a close working relationship with the General Counsel of the Department of the Navy, the senior civilian lawyer in the Department of the Navy.

The Judge Advocate General:
provides or supervises the provision of all legal advice and related services throughout the Department of the Navy, except for the advice and services provided by the General Counsel;
performs the functions required or authorized by law;
provides legal and policy advice to the Secretary of the Navy on military justice, administrative law, claims, operational and international law, and litigation involving these issues, and;
acts on other matters as directed by the Secretary of the Navy.

The principal deputy to the JAG is the Deputy Judge Advocate General of the Navy.

Nomination and appointment
The Judge Advocate General is nominated for appointment by the President with the advice and/or suggestion of the Secretary of Defense and the Secretary of the Navy, and must be confirmed via majority vote by the Senate. The Judge Advocate General is appointed to a four-year term of office but they historically serve for three. The Judge Advocate General has also historically been a naval officer, however, statute states that a Marine officer can be appointed to the position as long as they meet the requirements stated in the section.

Previously, the Judge Advocate General was appointed as a two-star rear admiral. In 2008, the National Defense Authorization Act for Fiscal Year 2008 advanced the position of the Judge Advocate General to a statutory three-star vice admiral or lieutenant general. The statutory three-star rank was amended and struck from U.S. law in the National Defense Authorization Act for Fiscal Year 2017, however the Navy currently still appoints the JAG to that rank.

Other than age and years of military service, there is no other statute of limitations on how many times the JAG can be renominated for appointment to that position if the President so chooses, however the JAG normally serves one term.

List of Judge Advocates General of the Navy

See also
U.S. Marine Corps Judge Advocate Division
Navy-Marine Corps Court of Criminal Appeal
Naval Inspector General
JAG (television series)
U.S. Army Judge Advocate General's Corps
U.S. Air Force Judge Advocate General's Corps
U.S. Coast Guard Legal Division

Notes

External links
U.S. Navy Judge Advocate General's Corps official website

 
United States Navy
Judge